Ashdown Foresters is a cow's milk hard cheese made in England.

Overview
It was created at the High Weald Dairy in Horsted Keynes, West Sussex. It is named after Ashdown Forest. It contains pasteurized cow's milk and vegetable rennet. It takes eight hours to make and three months to mature. It has a sweet, nutty flavour.

It won the gold medal at the World Cheese Awards in 2008. It also won the gold medal at the British Cheese Awards in 2008 and 2009.

References

English cheeses
West Sussex